Stafford Grammar School is a mixed independent day school at Burton Manor, located on the outskirts of Stafford, the county town of Staffordshire. Founded in 1982, the school inhabits a building built by the Victorian architect Augustus Pugin.

History
The school was founded in 1982 by a group of local parents. It is based in a Victorian manor house, originally designed and built for the Whitgreave family by Augustus Pugin. Many of the original design features such as the integrated chapel and the folly are still intact, though neither of these are currently in use.

In September 1982, in a leased building, the School was officially opened by its first patron the Right Honourable, the Earl of Shrewsbury. Dr J R Garrood, the first Headmaster, began his first day with 17 pupils and 3 part-time teachers. Since then, the School has grown to over 400 pupils and obtained ownership of its buildings and grounds.

The Independent Schools Joint Council accredited the School in 1985 and the Headmaster was elected to the Society of Headmasters and Headmistresses of Independent Schools (SHIMS) in 1991.

Academic performance
According to government school performance indicators, Stafford Grammar School is one of the top schools in Staffordshire. In 2010, 100% of A-level results were at grades A*-E with 68% being at grades A*-B, at AS level 98% of results were at grades A-E with 64% being at grades A-B and 97% of GCSE results were at grades A*-C with 53% being at grades A/A*. 100% of students achieved the benchmark of 5 or more GCSE passes at grades A*-C including English and Mathematics. In the academic year that finished in June 2006 the school was ranked top in Staffordshire based on league table results.

Houses 
Upon entrance into the school each tutor is assigned into a house, with 20 in each house per year.

The three houses are as follows:

 Talbot
 Anson
 Fitzherbert

References

External links
School Website
Stafford Preparatory School website
ISI Inspection Report

Private schools in Staffordshire
Educational institutions established in 1982
Member schools of the Independent Schools Association (UK)
Schools in Stafford
1982 establishments in England